Tatsumi Dam is a dam in the Ishikawa Prefecture of Japan, completed in 2012.

References 

Dams in Ishikawa Prefecture
Dams completed in 2012
Buildings and structures in Kanazawa, Ishikawa